Suppressor-inducer T cells are a specific subset of CD4+ T helper cells that "induce" CD8+ cytotoxic T cells to become "suppressor" cells.  Suppressor T cells are also known as CD25+–Foxp3+ regulatory T cells (nTregs), and reduce inflammation.

References

T cells